Daniel Heiner may refer to:
Daniel B. Heiner (1854–1944), member of the US House of Representatives
Daniel Heiner (Utah politician) (1850–?), member of the Utah House of Representatives